Cratopus sinhalensis, is a species of weevil found in Sri Lanka.

Description
This species has a body length is about 9 mm. Body black, evenly and thinly clothed with short pale hair-like scales with a coppery tinge. Head coarsely punctate. Eyes are moderately convex. Antennae brown. Prothorax with strongly rounded sides, and truncate and distinctly marginate base. Scutellurn with sparse hair-like scales. Elytra broadly ovate in female with very oblique shoulders. Legs black, and tarsi piceous. Femora smooth, coriaceous and tibiae rugosely punctate.

References 

Curculionidae
Insects of Sri Lanka
Beetles described in 1916